Tanokrom is a town in Ghana. It is located five kilometers from Takoradi the regional capital of the Western region of Ghana. It is a dormitory town and provides housing facilities for several families who work in and around Takoradi. A report by the United States Agency for International Development (USAID) in 2009 graded the town with having good drinking water and improved sanitation.

References

Populated places in the Western Region (Ghana)